Sandown Fort (map reference ) is a fort built in Sandown on the Isle of Wight in the middle of Sandown Bay. It is one of the many Palmerston Forts built on the island to protect it in response to a perceived French invasion. It was a replacement of the earlier Sandown Diamond Fort (see Sandown Bay) as in 1859 the Royal Commission felt it did not offer suitable protection. Construction of the fort began in April 1861 and was completed by September 1864 at a cost of £73,876. In later documents it is often referred to as Granite Fort. The fort originally had 18 9-inch R.M.L guns facing the sea behind iron shields, these guns were later upgraded and an extra 5 inches of armor was added.

The fort was sold in 1930 but during World War II the fort played a significant role in the D-Day landings as it housed sixteen pumps for the  PLUTO (Pipe Line Under The Ocean) operation to Allies supplied with fuel. Each of the 16 pumps supplied  of fuel per day at a pressure of 1,500 lb per square inch. In the 1950s the site went on to house the Isle of Wight Zoo, which it continues to do so to this day.

References

Publications
 Moore, David, 2010. The East Wight Defences, Solent Papers Number 10, David Moore, Gosport.

External links
 Victorian Forts data sheet for Sandown (Granite) Fort
 Victorian Forts data sheet for Sandown Barrack Battery

Forts on the Isle of Wight
Palmerston Forts
Government buildings completed in 1864
Infrastructure completed in 1864
1864 establishments in England